The Alliance of the National Community (Sangkum Cheat Niyum) that represented four parties had all of its four parties merge and be transformed into a political party called the Sangkum Jatiniyum Front Party and one of them is the Khmer Unity Party.

The Khmer Unity Party, is a Cambodian opposition party founded in 1997 by its actual president Khieu Rada, who was previously part of the royalist FUNCINPEC party. It declares itself a "liberal, democratic and nationalist" party.

SJFP KUP image gallery

See also 
:Category:Alliance of the National Community politicians

References

External links
sjfparty.free.fr

1997 establishments in Cambodia
Buddhist democratic parties
Cambodian democracy movements
Liberal parties in Cambodia
Nationalist parties in Cambodia
Political parties established in 1997
Political parties in Cambodia